Angela Goodwin (born Angela Bucci, 1 August 1925 – 25 March 2016), was an Italian stage, film and television actress.

Life and career
Born in Rome, Goodwin was the daughter of an Italian-American father, and spent her youth in the US where she enrolled at several drama courses and started her professional career with a stage company in Washington. In the second half of the 1960s she came back to Italy, where she continued to work on stage with some of the major companies of the time, including the ones directed by Orazio Costa, Vittorio Gassman, Giancarlo Sbragia and Garinei & Giovannini.

In 1970, Goodwin had her film breakout as Fortunata, one of the Tettamanzi sisters in the Alberto Lattuada's commedia all'italiana Come Have Coffee with Us. Another major success in her career was the role of Laura Perozzi, Philippe Noiret's wife in Mario Monicelli's box office hit My Friends, a role she reprised in the 1982 sequel All My Friends Part 2. She was also very active on television. Her last work was the short film Carlo e Clara. 

Goodwin was married to actor Franco Giacobini, with whom she often collaborated on stage.

Filmography

References

External links
 

1925 births
Italian stage actresses
Italian film actresses
Italian television actresses
Actresses from Rome
2016 deaths
20th-century Italian actresses
21st-century Italian actresses